World War II Combat: Road to Berlin, also known as Battlestrike: Secret Weapons, is a budget-priced first-person shooter, developed by Direct Action Games and published by Groove Games. It was panned by reviewers as having shoddy control, and a rushed, unfinished feel. The game was followed by World War II Combat: Iwo Jima, which released a few months later.

Story
World War II Combat: Road to Berlin takes place during the final days of World War II. The Germans have been developing secret long-range rockets (called "Vengeance Weapons") that they could use to attack opposing countries. Joseph Stalin, the leader of the Soviet Union at the time, wanted to get hold of these rockets in his attempt to dominate the western world. The Soviet Union joined Britain's battle. This meant that the Allies could not battle the Soviets to prevent them from getting hold of the Vengeance Weapons, but rather, they had to race against them to make sure that the weapons did not fall into Stalin's hands. Players take control of Lieutenant Stephen Moore, an officer of the OSS (Office of Strategic Services), a precursor to the CIA. The events that take place in this game are invented, bearing in mind that this storyline is completely fictitious and the "weapons", if any, truly did fall into Soviet hands.

Reception

The game received "generally unfavorable reviews" on both platforms according to the review aggregation website Metacritic.

See also
World War II Combat: Iwo Jima

References

External links
World War II Combat: Road to Berlin - Official website

2006 video games
Unreal Engine games
Video games developed in the United States
Windows games
World War II first-person shooters
Xbox games
Groove Games games
Multiplayer and single-player video games